United Nations Security Council Resolution 2166, concerning the shootdown of Malaysia Airlines Flight 17, was sponsored by Australia and adopted unanimously on 21 July 2014. The resolution expressed support for the "efforts to establish a full, thorough and independent international investigation into the incident in accordance with international civil aviation guidelines" and called on all United Nations member states "to provide any requested assistance to civil and criminal investigations".

Preparation
The resolution was drafted on 18 July, put into circulation on 19 July and agreed the next day. Russia, a permanent member with a veto right, supported the resolution after negotiations led to some text changes, including terming the incident as "downing" of the aircraft instead of "shooting down".

See also
United Nations Security Council Resolution 731
United Nations Security Council Resolution 748
 List of United Nations Security Council Resolutions 2101 to 2200 (2013–2015)

References

External links
Text of the Resolution at undocs.org

2014 United Nations Security Council resolutions
Malaysia Airlines Flight 17
United Nations Security Council resolutions concerning Malaysia
United Nations Security Council resolutions concerning Russia
2014 in Malaysia
2014 in Russia
2014 in Ukraine
July 2014 events